Dolichosybra is a genus of beetles in the family Cerambycidae, containing the following species:

 Dolichosybra annulicornis Breuning, 1942
 Dolichosybra apicalis (Gilmour, 1963)
 Dolichosybra elongata Breuning, 1942
 Dolichosybra strandi Breuning, 1943
 Dolichosybra strandiella Breuning, 1942
 Dolichosybra tubericollis Breuning, 1942

References

Apomecynini
Cerambycidae genera